Jorge Abad Airport  (Filipino: Paliparang Jorge Abad, Ilocano: Pagtayaban ti Jorge Abad), also known as Itbayat Airport, is an airport serving the island of Itbayat, the largest island in the province of Batanes, Philippines. The province's only other airport, Basco Airport, is located in the provincial capital, Basco, on Batan Island.

The airport is classified as a community airport by the Civil Aviation Authority of the Philippines (CAAP), a body of the Department of Transportation that is responsible for the operations of not only this airport but also of all other airports in the Philippines except the major international airports.

The northernmost airport in the Philippines was renamed in March 2017 through a Sangguniang Bayan (municipal council) resolution after Jorge Abad, the first Ivatan cabinet member who was appointed in 1955 as Secretary of Public Works. His son, Florencio Abad, was instrumental in sourcing the funds for the airport construction during his time as congressional representative for Batanes. Manual labor was used during the airport's construction to level the uneven terrain, since the inaccessibility of the island in the 1990s made heavy equipment unavailable for use.

Airlines and destinations

References

See also
List of airports in the Philippines

Airports in the Philippines
Buildings and structures in Batanes